Bhadlachuhron Ki Basti village is located in Phalodi Tehsil of Jodhpur district in Rajasthan, India. It is situated 78km away from sub-district headquarter Phalodi and 213km away from district headquarter Jodhpur. 

The total geographical area of village is 12668 hectares. Bhadlachuhron Ki Basti has a total population of 1,610 people. There are about 281 houses in Bhadlachuhron Ki Basti village. Phalodi is nearest town to Bhadlachuhron Ki Basti which is approximately 78km away.

References

Jodhpur district